Joshua Stanford (born July 25, 1994) is a professional Canadian football wide receiver. He was originally drafted by the Saskatchewan Roughriders with the 62nd overall selection in the 2016 CFL Draft and played in 21 games over three seasons for the team. He was traded to the Montreal Alouettes on October 10, 2018 where he played in three games and was released during the following offseason. He played college football for the Virginia Tech Hokies and Kansas Jayhawks.

References

External links
 BC Lions bio

1994 births
Living people
American football wide receivers
Canadian football wide receivers
Canadian players of American football
Virginia Tech Hokies football players
Montreal Alouettes players
Saskatchewan Roughriders players
Players of Canadian football from Ontario
Sportspeople from Mississauga
BC Lions players
Kansas Jayhawks football players